Don't Look Back (1996) is a novel by Norwegian writer Karin Fossum, the second to feature Inspector Konrad Sejer. The novel is the first book of Fossum which was translated into English. It won the Glass Key Award in 1997. It was filmed in 2007 as La ragazza del lago (aka The Girl by the Lake).

Plot
The body of a local teenage girl named Annie was found by an idyllic pond in the woods. The suspect list grows indefinitely. However, as Inspector Sejer and his partner Jacob Skarre question the girl's family, and others, they realize she has a shocking secret she shared with no one. He strives to understand Annie's true character, as the answer may lie in her own strange behavior leading up to her death.

References

1996 Norwegian novels
Novels by Karin Fossum
Novels set in Norway
Norwegian crime novels